Winner Takes All is a 2004 British short film directed by Helen M Grace, written by Machico Bros & Helen M Grace.

Nominated for BAFTA Cymru Best Short Film award 2004/2005

The short film stars JC Mac, Chico Slimani, Lauretta Lewis, and Barber Ali.

Plot
A stranger (JC Mac) walks into a bar and is given a challenge to win a pot of money. There are three tasks that he must complete, but he is distracted by a young woman and doesn't listen to the rules properly. The result is that he completes the challenge in a mixed-up and shocking way.
His story is told in rhyme by a Narrator (Chico Slimani).

Production
Filmed for two days at Caesar's Nightclub in Streatham, South London in September 2003.

External links
 

2004 short films
2004 films
British short films